30 Geminorum is a suspected astrometric binary star system in the northern zodiac constellation of Gemini. It is visible to the naked eye as a faint, orange-hued point of light with an apparent visual magnitude of 4.49. The distance to this star, as estimated through the use of parallax, is about 299 light years. It is drifting further away from the Sun with a heliocentric radial velocity of +9.5 km/s.

The suffix notation indicates it displays an overabundance of calcium in its spectrum. It is a red clump giant, which means it is on the horizontal branch and is generating energy through helium fusion at its core. The star is about 1.2 billion years old with 2.3 times the Sun's mass. It is radiating 189 times the luminosity of the Sun from its enlarged photosphere at an effective temperature of 4,518 K.

There is a 13th magnitude visual companion located at an angular separation of  along a position angle of 187° from the brighter star, as of 2011.

References

K-type giants
Horizontal-branch stars
Astrometric binaries

Gemini (constellation)
Geminorum, 30
Durchmusterung objects
048433
032249
2478